Raguluthunna Bharatham is a 1992 Telugu-language action film, produced by Challa Subrahmanyam under the Maitra Creations banner and directed by Allani Sridhar. It stars Akkineni Nageswara Rao, Jagapathi Babu, Divyavani  and music composed by Devendran.

Plot
The film opens in 1947 at Andaman Jail, where three prisoners named Raghupati, Raghava, and Rajaram manage to escape and go their separate ways. During the escape, Raghupati, a true patriot, meets with an accident and falls into a coma. He recovers after 45 years, in present-day India. Meanwhile, Raghava Rao has become the Chief Minister and rules with an iron fist, aided by his ruthless son, Tilak. 

Raghupati returns to India and is welcomed by the CM, who admits him to the hospital until he recovers fully, for political gain. At the same time, Tilak stabs a journalist who exposed their atrocities. Fortunately, a brave cop named Inspector Pratap rescues the journalist and joins Raghupati in the same hospital. The villains plan a bomb blast, but Raghupati receives a call from Rajaram, who has become a Naxalite and continues his fight against oppression. He calms Raghupati and exposes the state of affairs to him.

Swetha, a reporter, seeks Raghupati's help while fleeing from goons. She is a single parent, and her son Vicky accompanies them. A bomb explodes, and the world assumes Raghupati is dead. The next day, Raghupati decides to hide to disrupt the status quo. Here, he slowly experiences the contrast between what they thought and today's conditions. He also discovers that Pratap and Swetha are a divorced couple when he seeks the truth.

Swetha interviews Rajaram, and the DSP insults her for his whereabouts, causing her to misunderstand her husband and separate from him. Raghupati resolves their conflict and reunites them. He also meets Taxi Babai, a man who is sociable and always criticizes and condemns the totalitarian government. Meanwhile, Tilak traps and kills his daughter, Bharati. Babai witnesses it and forces Tilak to confess. Later, Raghupati spots the injustices, irregularities, and evils in society and rebels against Raghava Rao. They label him insane and torture him.

Rajaram releases Raghupati from their clutches by abducting Tilak. The three ex-mates reunite, but only one remains committed to their cause. Raghupati forms a non-violence movement called Jaathisena against the government. The villains conspire to destroy it. Tilak kills Taxi Babai, witnessed by Pratap, who tries to apprehend him. The authorities declare Tilak not guilty, and devastated Pratap resigns and joins Jaathisena.

Raghupati awakens the social conscience, igniting the country and dethroning Raghava Rao's regime. The villains plot to assassinate Raghupati and plan a mass murder. Raghupati is shot dead in that clash, but the enraged public rises up and defeats the villains. The movie ends with Pratap, Swetha, and their son continuing Raghupati's mission.

Cast
Akkineni Nageswara Rao as Raghupathi 
Jagapathi Babu as Inspector Pratap
Divyavani as Swetha
Dasari Narayana Rao as Taxi Babai
Gollapudi Maruthi Rao as CM Raghava Rao
Tanikella Bharani
Dharmavarapu Subramanyam 
Pokuri Babu Rao as Tilak
Kota Shankar Rao as Rajaram
Sridevi as Bharati 
Y. Vijaya
Baby Sunayana as Vicky

Soundtrack

Music composed by Devendran. Lyrics written by Devi Priya. Music released by the Lahari Music Company.

References

External links 
 

1992 films
1990s Telugu-language films
Films scored by Vidyasagar